Kácov is a market town in Kutná Hora District in the Central Bohemian Region of the Czech Republic. It has about 800 inhabitants.

Administrative parts
Villages of Račíněves, Zderadinky, Zderadiny and Zliv are administrative parts of Kácov.

Geography
It lies mostly in the Vlašim Uplands. The southeastern part of the municipal territory extends into the Upper Sázava Hills. The market town proper is situated in a meander of the Sázava River.

History
The first written mention of Kácov is from 1318.

Sights
Kácov is known for the Kácov Castle. It was built in the Baroque style in 1726–1733 for Duchess Anna Maria Franziska of Saxe-Lauenburg on the site of an older and smaller castle. Since 2008, it has been owned by the market town of Kácov and is open to the public.

The Church of the Nativity of the Virgin Mary was originally a Gothic church from the 14th century. It was rebuilt in the Baroque style in the first half of the 18th century, Empire style modifications were made in 1819. After being damaged by the wind in 1845, it was completely rebuilt in 1862.

Notable people
Jan Valerián Jirsík (1798–1883), Bishop of České Budějovice

References

External links

Populated places in Kutná Hora District
Market towns in the Czech Republic